Cairns Bank (formerly and commonly known as "Cairns Penny") is an Australian financial institution, operating primarily in retail banking. It was established in April 1899.

Cairns Bank operates a single outlet  at 24 Grafton Street, Cairns City, Queensland.

History 
On Saturday 22 April 1899, the Cairns Penny Savings Bank opened for the first time.

Over the years, the bank has undergone various transformations and name changes due to legislative changes. These are summarised below:

References

Further reading

External links 

 

Banks of Australia
Banks established in 1899
Mutual savings banks in Australia
Cairns, Queensland
Australian companies established in 1899